Micrella may refer to:
 Micrella, a genus of gastropods in the family Pneumodermatidae, synonym of Pneumoderma
 Micrella, a genus of beetles in the family Ptiliidae, synonym of Ptilium
 Micrella, a genus of nemerteans in the family Lineidae, synonym of Zygeupolia